Clark's Town is a settlement in Jamaica; the population of the settlement is 3,139 people

References

Populated places in Trelawny Parish